There are four species of deer living wild in Ireland today, namely red deer, fallow deer, sika deer, and the recently introduced Reeve's muntjac, which is becoming established. Recently, roe deer have been spotted in county Wicklow and county Armagh.
The Irish elk and the Red Deer both became extinct in Ireland about 10,500 years ago during the Nahanagan Stadial. The reindeer was extirpated from Ireland about 9500 years ago. Many of their skeletal remains have been found well preserved in peat land.

The current red deer population, once thought to have been descendants from the native stock which had come to Ireland at the end of the last ice age, are now believed to have been brought from Britain across the North Channel by neolithic people around 3300 BC. They almost became extinct again in the 20th century, with only around 60 left, but have now made a comeback to approximately one thousand where the "native" herd has survived in Killarney National Park.

Fallow deer were introduced in Norman times, and now have a population of about 10,000. Sika deer were introduced in Powerscourt park in 1860, escaped from captivity, and now number about 20,000. Scottish roe deer were introduced to the Lissadell Estate in Co. Sligo around 1870 by Sir Henry Gore-Booth. The Lissadell deer were noted for their occasional abnormal antlers and survived in that general area for about 50 years before they died out, and few roe deer currently exist in Ireland.

Extinct/extirpated deer species
Irish elk - became extinct about 10,500 years ago
Reindeer - became extinct in Ireland about 9,500 years ago

Reintroduced species
Red deer - reintroduced about 3300 BC

Introduced species
Fallow deer
Chinese water deer https://www.irishtimes.com/news/concern-over-illegal-spread-of-chinese-deer-1.906866#:~:text=A%20SPECIES%20of%20Chinese%20deer,established%20itself%20in%20the%20southeast.
Roe deer
Sika deer
Reeve's muntjac

Gallery

References

Valuable reading
Butler, F. & Keelleher, C. (eds) (2012). "All-Ireland Mammal Symposium 2009". Irish Naturalists' Journal, Belfast, 90 pp.

Mammals of Europe
Fauna of Ireland
Deer